Dailenys Alcántara Pacheco (born 10 August 1991) is a Cuban track and field athlete who competes in the triple jump and occasionally the long jump. She was the 2007 World Youth champion then became the first person to win two straight triple jump title at the World Junior Championships in Athletics (2008 and 2010). She represented Cuba at the 2011 World Championships in Athletics.

Career

Born in Santiago de Cuba, Alcántara's talent for track and field was identified at a young age. She competed in sprinting events and the high jump, but found most success in the triple jump, taking victories at the Cuban schools games in 2002 and 2004. A triple jump/long jump double followed at the 2006 ESPA high school championships. Her international debut came at the age of fifteen at the 2007 World Youth Championships in Athletics. She entered the competition as the world's leading youth athlete with her personal best of 14.21 m and claimed the triple jump title ahead of fellow Cuban Josleidy Ribalta. She also placed seventh in the long jump.

Despite being one of the younger entrants, Alcántara improved two personal bests at the 2008 World Junior Championships in Athletics, jumping 14.25 m to take the triple jump gold medal and 6.41 m to earn herself the long jump bronze medal. She began to establish herself nationally in 2009 by winning the long jump at the Barrientos Memorial and placing third in the triple jump with a Central American and Caribbean junior record of 14.36 m (beating Mabel Gay's former mark). That year she entered senior international events, winning the long jump at the 2009 ALBA Games and placing sixth at the 2009 Central American and Caribbean Championships in Athletics. She also won the triple jump at the 2009 Pan American Junior Athletics Championships.

She focused just on the triple jump from 2010 onwards. She won the Barrientos Memorial that year, setting a best of 14.34 m there. At the 2010 World Junior Championships in Athletics she became the first athlete to win back-to-back triple jump titles and was over 30 cm ahead of the competition. The following year she set a personal best of 14.56 m in Havana, then had podium finishes on the Brazilian Athletics Tour. She was one of four Cuban women to compete in the triple jump at the 2011 World Championships in Athletics, but on her major debut her mark of 13.78 m was not enough to reach the final. She defeated two-time world champion Yargelis Savigne at the 2012 IAAF Centenary meet in Havana with a personal best jump of 14.58 m. She came third at the adidas Grand Prix Diamond League meet in New York City in June and made her first Cuban Olympic team a month later.

Personal bests
Outdoor
Long jump: 6.41 m (wind: +1.9 m/s) –  Bydgoszcz, 12 July 2008
Triple jump: 14.58 m (wind: -1.4 m/s) –  La Habana, 27 May 2012
Indoor
Triple jump: 13.91 m –  Madrid, 18 February 2012

International competitions

References

External links
 (in English)

Ecured biography (in Spanish)

Living people
1991 births
Cuban female triple jumpers
Cuban female long jumpers
Sportspeople from Santiago de Cuba
Athletes (track and field) at the 2012 Summer Olympics
Olympic athletes of Cuba
Athletes (track and field) at the 2015 Pan American Games
Pan American Games competitors for Cuba
Central American and Caribbean Games silver medalists for Cuba
Competitors at the 2014 Central American and Caribbean Games
Central American and Caribbean Games medalists in athletics
20th-century Cuban women
20th-century Cuban people
21st-century Cuban women